Isoprenol, also known as 3-methylbut-3-en-1-ol, is a hemiterpene alcohol. It is produced industrially as an intermediate to 3-methylbut-2-en-1-ol (prenol): global production in 2001 can be estimated as 6–13 thousand tons.

Isoprenol is produced by the reaction between isobutene (2-methylpropene) and formaldehyde.

The thermodynamically preferred prenol with the more substituted double bond cannot be directly formed in the above reaction, but is produced via a subsequent isomerisation:

This isomerisation reaction is catalyzed by any species which can form an allyl complex without excessive hydrogenation of the substrate, for example poisoned palladium catalysts.

Notes

References

Hemiterpenes
Alkenols